Spotted Bear River is a stream in the U.S. state of Montana. It is a tributary to the South Fork Flathead River.

Spotted Bear River was named in 1861 by a party of miners who encountered a bear with white spots.

References

Rivers of Montana
Rivers of Flathead County, Montana